McCleary Glacier is a broad glacier about  long, draining southward into Darwin Glacier, Antarctica, just west of Tentacle Ridge. It was mapped by the United States Geological Survey from tellurometer surveys and Navy air photos, 1959–63, and was named by the Advisory Committee on Antarctic Names for George McCleary, a public information officer on the staff of the U.S. Antarctic Projects Officer (USAPO) (1959–61), whose labors helped to start the Bulletin of the USAPO.

See also
Walker Cirque

Further reading 
 Jane G. Ferrigno, Kevin M. Foley, Charles Swithinbank, and Richard S. Williams, Jr., Coastal-Change and Glaciological Map of the Ross Island Area, Antarctica: 1962–2005, U.S. Geological Survey Geologic Investigations Series Map I–2600–I, 1 map sheet, 23-p. text. 
 Margaret Bradshaw, Successful Expedition For Canterbury Museum Deep Held Party, Antarctic Vol 12. No. 8 Issue No. 140 (June, 1992), PP 250 – 251

References

Glaciers of Oates Land